Ansett Worldwide Aviation Services (AWAS) or simply Ansett Worldwide was one of the world's largest commercial jet aircraft leasing companies. Its head office was located in Dublin, Ireland, and it had offices in Miami, New York City, and Singapore.

In August 2017, AWAS was acquired by Dubai Aerospace Enterprise, both managing at least  airliners.

History
Ansett Worldwide Aviation Services was Ansett Australia's subsidiary and leasing arm since 1985. By 1996, it was made a distinct company from Ansett Australia. Like Ansett Australia, Ansett Worldwide was owned by TNT and News Corporation. When TNT sold its share in Ansett Australia to Air New Zealand in 1996, it retained its ownership of Ansett Worldwide.

Ansett Worldwide was sold to an affiliate of Morgan Stanley Dean Witter in February 2000 for close to US$600 million. At the time of sale, AWAS had a leasing portfolio of 105 aircraft valued at US$4 billion, with 47 airlines. The Ansett name was retained as it was instantly recognisable in the global aviation industry.  Under Morgan Stanley ownership the company was renamed simply Ansett Worldwide, the Aviation Services being omitted. The Ansett Worldwide fleet was combined with the Morgan Stanley Aircraft Leasing fleet, resulting in a combined fleet size of 180 aircraft by 2003.

In 2004 Ansett Worldwide was rebranded as AWAS. A company media release issued to coincide with the rebranding stated that the company had outlived its association with a failed airline, hence the dropping of the Ansett name. In the industry it was known that some customers had shown a reluctance to deal with Ansett Worldwide, perceiving that the aircraft available were ex-Ansett Airlines aircraft that had been sitting idle since the airline had ceased operations, despite assurances from the lessor that this was not true.

Morgan Stanley sold AWAS in 2006 to the UK hedge fund Terra Firma with management and operations relocated to Dublin.

In 2007 AWAS acquired and integrated the Pegasus Aviation Finance Company into its company.

Corporate affairs
AWAS had its head office in The Galleries building (500 George Street) in the CBD of Sydney during the period of Morgan Stanley ownership. Administratively, the CEO and selected staff relocated to the Seattle office to be closer to the owners in Morgan Stanley's New York headquarters. The company's marketing, I.T., communications, legal, financial and administrative sections remained in Sydney throughout this period. Post the acquisition by Terra Firma the Sydney office closed, staff were either retrenched or relocated to the new Ireland office in Block B of Riverside IV along Sir John Rogerson's Quay in Dublin, Republic of Ireland. Its Miami office was in One Brickell Square in Downtown Miami, while its New York City office was in Suite 203 of 620 at 444 Madison Avenue.

Previously, its Dublin location was in the City West Business Campus. It also had a London office in the City of Westminster. At a later point the Dublin office was located in Regus House at Harcout Centre. By 2007 the company opened its new Dublin headquarters, Alexandra House, The Sweepstakes, Ballsbridge. At that time it consolidated its London office into its Dublin headquarters.

The company previously had an office in Bellevue, Washington State. In 2006, the office had 30 employees in the office. By 2007, it merged into the Miami office.

References

External links

 AWAS Official site

Companies based in Dublin (city)
Aircraft leasing companies of the Republic of Ireland
Ansett Australia
Transport companies established in 1985
Irish companies established in 1985
Transport companies disestablished in 2017
2017 disestablishments in Ireland
2017 mergers and acquisitions